Kanjirappuzha River is one of the tributaries of the river Thuthapuzha. Thuthapuzha is one of the main  tributaries of the Bharathapuzha River, the second-longest river in Kerala, South India.

See also
Bharathapuzha - Main river
Thuthapuzha - One of the main  tributaries of the river Bharathapuzha

Other tributaries of the river Thuthapuzha
Kunthipuzha
Kanjirappuzha
Ambankadavu
Thuppanadippuzha

Rivers of Palakkad district
Bharathappuzha